Jimmy Connors was the defending champion but did not compete that year.

Tim Mayotte won in the final 3–6, 6–4, 7–5 against Brad Gilbert.

Seeds
The top eight seeds received a bye to the second round.

  Tim Mayotte (champion)
  Brad Gilbert (final)
  Jay Berger (third round)
  Yannick Noah (third round)
  Dan Goldie (second round)
  Paul Annacone (third round)
  Derrick Rostagno (third round)
  Robert Seguso (second round)
  Richard Matuszewski (first round)
  Paul Chamberlin (quarterfinals)
  Todd Witsken (semifinals)
  Ramesh Krishnan (quarterfinals)
  Milan Šrejber (first round)
  Jimmy Arias (second round)
  John Frawley (first round)
  Jeff Tarango (second round)

Draw

Finals

Top half

Section 1

Section 2

Bottom half

Section 3

Section 4

External links
 1989 Sovran Bank Classic draw

1989 Grand Prix (tennis)